Afagh is an Iranian newspaper in the Fars region. The concessionaire of this newspaper was Seyed Javad Bavanati and it was published in Shiraz since 1909.

See also
List of magazines and newspapers of Fars

References

1909 establishments in Iran
Newspapers established in 1909
Newspapers published in Fars Province
Mass media in Fars Province
Newspapers published in Qajar Iran